Patrick Buzas (born May 17, 1987) is a German-Hungarian professional ice hockey forward, who is currently an unrestricted free agent. He most recently played for Düsseldorfer EG in the Deutsche Eishockey Liga (DEL). He previously played 6 seasons with the Thomas Sabo Ice Tigers.

On April 20, 2018, Buzas opted to leave the Ice Tigers as a free agent, signing a one-year deal with Düsseldorfer EG, his fifth top flight club.

References

External links

1987 births
Living people
Augsburger Panther players
Düsseldorfer EG players
Hannover Scorpions players
ERC Ingolstadt players
Sportspeople from Augsburg
Thomas Sabo Ice Tigers players
German ice hockey centres